Mike J. Bell (born August 30, 1957) is a former American college and professional football player who was a defensive end in the National Football League for twelve seasons during the 1970s, 1980s and 1990s.  Bell played college football for Colorado State University, where he earned All-American honors.  He was the second overall pick in the 1979 NFL Draft, and played for the NFL's Kansas City Chiefs for his entire professional career.

Bell was born in Wichita, Kansas, where he played multiple sports at Bishop Carroll Catholic High School from 1971 to 1975.

He attended Colorado State University, where he played for the Colorado State Rams football from 1975 to 1978.  He was recognized as a consensus first-team All-American as a senior in 1978.  His twin brother Mark Bell also played for Colorado State. Bell was inducted to the Colorado State University Athletics Hall of Fame in 2001.

During his twelve NFL seasons, he played in 135 games and started 100 of them, compiling 40 quarterback sacks and 10 recovered fumbles.

External links 
 NFL.com player page
 Colorado State Athletics Hall of Fame Bio

1957 births
Living people
All-American college football players
American football defensive ends
Colorado State Rams football players
Kansas City Chiefs players
Players of American football from Wichita, Kansas
American twins
Twin sportspeople